Mira Road (Pronunciation: [miɾaː]; station code: MIRA) is a passenger railway station located at Mira Road, a suburb in the Western Suburbs of Mumbai. The route of the station is located between the salt pan towards the western zone of the suburb leading towards Bhayandar.
Platform 1 and 3 are for north bound trains towards Bhayander and Virar while platform 2 and 4 are for south bound trains towards Borivali, Andheri, Bandra, Dadar and Churchgate. Slow trains use platform 1 and 2 (with an exemption of Fast trains originating and terminating from Bhayander which also use the same platforms) while 3 and 4 are used by Fast trains originating from Virar.

Mira Road station consists of four side platforms, divided into two sections by the twin bores of the station; a skywalk serving the commuters to Shanti Nagar and Naya Nagar zone. Trains serve the station 22 hours a day every day; the headway between trains is 5 minutes during peak periods, with less than 10 mins service at other times. Mira Road station is also served by three bus services including BEST Transport, MBMT Transport and TMT Transport buses, serving the areas of Western Suburbs,  Mumbai City District, Thane, Navi Mumbai and Mira Bhayandar.

Two escalators have also been installed (one at P.F. No. 1 & other one at P.F. No. 2/3) to the middle FOB and new ticket counter have been initiated on 28 August 2019 by Shiv Sena politician Mr. Rajan Vichare.
P.F. No. 1 has been extended to handle 15-coach Down Locals.
Three new escalators are being installed at P.F. 1, P.F. 2/3 & P.F. 4 to the southern FOB.

Wi-fi's have also been installed on all platforms.

Development 
In 2015, MMRDA authorities had implemented that Mira Road station will be developed along with other railway stations from the Central and Harbour lines of the Mumbai Suburban Railway with the installations of escalators, footover bridges and elevators.

References

Railway stations in Thane district
Transport in Mira-Bhayandar
Mumbai Suburban Railway stations
Mumbai WR railway division